Oestocephalidae is an extinct family of Late Carboniferous aistopod stegocephalians. Fossils have been found from Ohio, Illinois, and Colorado in the United States; England; and the Czech Republic. It includes the genera Coloraderpeton and Oestocephalus. Oestocephalids have robust skulls and narrow, rounded snouts. They possess heavily ossified gastralia and dorsal osteoderms. Like other aïstopods, oestocephalids were elongate, having approximately 110 vertebrae. Oestocephalidae was named in 2003, with the type species being Oestocephalus amphiuminus.

References

Aistopods
Pennsylvanian first appearances
Pennsylvanian extinctions